The Mamilovs (Russian Мамилов(ы); ING. – Mamil-nakan – Ingush teip) are an Ingush clan. The clan comprises about 1,500 people. It is one of a few Ingush clans whose members share one name.
 
They come from the village of Erzi Dzheyrakhsky District Ingushetia, which has been, since 2000, a part of the State Nature Reserve "Erzi".
At this time, they live mostly in Malgobeksky District and Dzheyrakhsky District of Ingushetia.

Ingush local historian and ethnographer Chakh Akhriev describes the origins:
Kist – the son of a famous Syrian the owner of the house Kamen (Comnenus), during the first Crusades moved from Syria and Abkhazia, and hence, after a while, went to the Georgia. But Georgia was at that time in the sad state of constant attacks Arabs and Turkish, so that Kist was forced to run away from here into impregnable Caucasus Mountains and lived in one of the gorges North Caucasus, near the headwaters of Terek and ... His son Chard (according to some – Cha) was also the son Chard. The latter was built in Arzi (Erzi) 16 "siege" towers and castles that exist at the present time. After Chard followed by his direct descendants: Oedipus, Elbiaz and the sons of the last Manuel (Mamil) and And (Yand). After the death of Manuel (Mamil) his son Daurbek quarreled with his uncle And, left Kist society and moved to a nearby, Dzherahovskoe society.

The clan has a relationship with Yandiev and Dakhkilgov clans.

External links
 "About Kist society" Article in Ingush newspaper  "Ingushetia"
 "Ethnic composition of the North Caucasus in the 18th – beginning of the 20th century" (published by "Science")

Ingush people